Ocilla may refer to:
 Ocilla, Georgia, a town in the United States
 Aucilla River, earlier also known as Ocilla, a river in Georgia and Florida, United States
 OCILLA, the Online Copyright Infringement Liability Limitation Act

See also 
 Ocella